Pete Sterbick is an American football coach and former player. Sterbick is currently the offensive coordinator at Colorado School of Mines, a position he has held since 2019.

Coaching career

Colorado School of Mines
Mines won the Rocky Mountain Athletic Conference (RMAC) title in 2019, 2021, and 2022. In 2022, Mines finished 13-3 and played for the NCAA Division II national championship, losing to Ferris State.  Quarterback John Matocha won the Harlon Hill Trophy, the equivalent to the Heisman Trophy, awarded to the best player in NCAA Division II football. In 2021, Mines finished 12-2, and made it to the NCAA Division II semifinals before losing to Valdosta State. In 2019, Mines completed a 11–0 regular season record before losing in the second round of the NCAA Division II playoffs to Texas A&M University–Commerce to finish 12–1 on the season.

Pre-Mines career 
Sterbick previously was the offensive coordinator at Montana Tech. Montana Tech won the Frontier Conference championships in 2015 and 2016 and made it to the quarterfinals of the NAIA playoffs, finishing each season with a record of 10–2. In 2017, the Tech offense set an NAIA record with 932 yards of offense in a single game. In 2012 and 2013, Sterbick served as the head football coach at McPherson College in McPherson, Kansas. His record at McPherson was 9–11. Before being hired at McPherson College, he was the offensive coordinator for Grand View University in Des Moines, Iowa for four years, where he helped start the program. Prior to Grand View, he was a graduate assistant at Washington State University for three seasons.

Playing career
Sterbick played college football at Augustana College—now known as Augustana University—in Sioux Falls, South Dakota, from 1998 to 2002.  He was a wide receiver and also punted.

Head coaching record

References

External links
 Colorado Mines profile
 Montana Tech profile

Year of birth missing (living people)
Living people
American football wide receivers
Augustana (South Dakota) Vikings football players
Colorado Mines Orediggers football coaches
Grand View Vikings football coaches
McPherson Bulldogs football coaches
Missouri Western Griffons football coaches
Montana Tech Orediggers football coaches
North Dakota Fighting Hawks football coaches
Washington State Cougars football coaches